Plasmodium brumpti is a parasite of the genus Plasmodium subgenus Sauramoeba. As in all Plasmodium species, P. brumpti has both vertebrate and insect hosts. The vertebrate hosts for this parasite are reptiles.

Taxonomy 
This species was described by Peláez and Perez-Reyes in 1952 in the reptile Sceloporus borridus. It was named after Alexandre Joseph Emile Brumpt (1877–1951) a French professor of parasitology.

Description 
Plasmodium brumpti are differentiated from other Plasmodium species by several characteristics. In the blood of the reptile host, parasites in the schizont stage produce 12-22 merozoites. The gametocytes are elongated and ovular. Both schizonts and gametocytes are fairly large, more than twice the size of the host cell nucleus.

Distribution 
P. brumpti has been found in reptiles in Morelos, Alpoyeca, and Puente de Ixtla, Mexico.

See also 
List of Plasmodium species infecting reptiles

References 

brumpti